This is a list of current and former National Hockey League (NHL) mascots, sorted alphabetically. The New York Rangers are the only team to have never had a mascot.

Current mascots

Al the Octopus

Al the Octopus is the octopus mascot of the Detroit Red Wings. It is also the only mascot that is not costumed. In 1952, when east side fish merchants Pete and Jerry Cusimano threw a real octopus onto the Olympia arena ice, the eight legs represented the eight victories needed to secure a Stanley Cup in those six-team days. Since then, fans throw an octopus onto the ice for good luck. In the 1995 Playoffs, fans threw fifty-four onto the ice. Arena Manager and Zamboni driver Al Sobotka ceremoniously scoops them up and whirls them over his head, and play continues. NHL Commissioner Gary Bettman forbade Sobotka from doing so during the 2008 playoffs, claiming that debris flew off the octopuses and onto the ice. Sobotka and the Red Wings have denied that this occurs, but even so Sobotka acquiesced and now twirls the octopuses once he departs the ice. In 2011, the NHL forbade fans from throwing any octopuses on the ice, penalizing all violators with a $500 fine. This has led to local outcry at the seemingly intentional destruction of a classic tradition. Red Wings' forward Johan Franzen has pledged to pay any and all fines as an attempt to continue the tradition.

Two identical large purple prop octopuses (Al), named after ice manager Al Sobotka, used to be positioned in or on top of Joe Louis Arena for the duration of the playoffs. After closing down the arena after the 2016-2017 season, one was sold for $7,700.

Bailey

Bailey, the mascot of the Los Angeles Kings is a 6-foot lion (6 foot 4 inches with mane included) who wears No. 72 because it is the average temperature in Los Angeles. He debuted during the 2007-2008 season and was named in honor of Garnet Bailey, who served as the Kings' Director of Pro Scouting from 1994 until his death in the September 11 attacks. He wears the patch worn by the Kings during the season following the attacks in honor of both Ace and Mark Bavis. Bailey is the Kings' second mascot; the first was a snow leopard named Kingston, who debuted in 1990 before being retired the same year.  In 2015, Kingston was made the mascot for the Kings' AHL affiliate Ontario Reign.

For the 2009-10 season, the Kings partnered with Carl's Jr. to create a series of videos in which Kings organization members competed against Carl's Jr. organization members. The first installment in which Bailey appears is a spoof on Carl's Jr.'s commercials, with Bailey replacing scantily clad actresses.

Since 2013 Bailey has been involved in a Twitter feud with CM Punk, a Chicago native and die-hard Chicago Blackhawks fan. During the 2014 playoffs when the Blackhawks faced the Kings in the Western Conference Finals, the two made a bet on the series stating that the loser must upload a picture of themselves wearing the winning team's jersey. Ultimately Punk posted a picture of himself in front of United Center in Chicago wearing a Kings jersey after the Kings eliminated the Blackhawks in seven games.

In the fall of 2014 during a Blackhawks-Kings game at Staples Center Bailey jumped off his ATV and delivered an elbow drop to Punk in the backstage area, in what was a rather comedic bit of their feud.

Bernie the St. Bernard
Bernie, the newest mascot of the Colorado Avalanche, debuted to the public against the Vancouver Canucks at Pepsi Center on October 3, 2009, in Denver, Colorado. Bernie, short for Bernard, is a St. Bernard dog. Bernie is the second mascot since Howler the Yeti who was retired early in the Avalanche franchise. Bernie's jersey is marked with a bone that resembles the #1. A fan page for Bernie was also unveiled October 3, 2009.

Benny
Benny was the mascot of the original Winnipeg Jets from 1986 to 1996.  He was named in honor of both Ben Hatskin, the first owner of the Jets, and Elton John's hit song "Bennie and the Jets." He wore a B on the front of his jersey, in the spot where a C for captain or A for alternate captain would otherwise go. He has since reemerged as a secondary mascot for the current Winnipeg Jets, beginning with the 2016 Heritage Classic.

Blades the Bruin

Blades the Bruin serves as the team mascot for the Boston Bruins since 1999. "Blades the Bruin is notable because he is the only known bear who does not hibernate. Blades first took an interest in hockey when watching Johnny Bucyk play pond hockey with groups of neighborhood children. One day, he sneaked in the back of Bucyk's truck and was taken to the Boston Garden where Bucyk fed him pizza, hot dogs, popcorn, and pop from the concession stand. Blades was named by a young fan, Jillian Dempsey, currently a hockey player for the Boston Pride in the PHF, in attendance at that evening's game. Bucyk invited Blades to stay at the Garden and he agreed, assuming that the Bruins were bears like himself. Blades wears a XXXL jersey and size 13 skates."

In January and February, Blades travels around the greater Boston area giving bear hugs to raise money for the Bruins Foundation.

For a sizable amount of the team's more recent TV and online ads, a different anthropomorphic, and more "lifelike" ursine character simply known as "The Bear", but without a Bruins jersey/uniform, appears in official Bruins video advertising.

Buoy

Buoy is a 6-foot-tall, furry, blue troll and the mascot of the Seattle Kraken. His backstory is that he is the nephew of the Fremont Troll, a famous sculpture in Seattle. The team explained they did not want to use a kraken as a mascot, saying that nobody knows what a kraken looks like. They also didn't want to use an octopus because that belongs to the Detroit Red Wings. The process of finding a mascot took two years, since around the time the team unveiled their name in July 2020.

Buoy made his anticipated debut before a pre-season game against the Vancouver Canucks on October 1, 2022. Prior to this date, Buoy's initial debut date was Christmas 2021, but was postponed due to the ongoing spread of COVID-19.

Carlton the Bear
Carlton the Bear is a 6'4" anthropomorphic polar bear, and the official mascot of the Toronto Maple Leafs. His first public appearance was on October 10, 1995, at the Leafs' home-opener in Toronto against the New York Islanders.

Carlton's name and number (#60) comes from the location of Maple Leaf Gardens, 60 Carlton Street in Toronto, the Leafs home arena from 1931 to 1999. They have since moved to Scotiabank Arena (formerly Air Canada Centre) on Bay Street. Since his debut, Carlton has gained fame through appearances at Leafs home games. He has also occasionally travelled with the team, having made appearances at 20 different arenas in 17 cities over his career. To date, Carlton has tossed more than 15,000 shirts into the audience, led various cheers, and spread Maple Leaf spirit to thousands of fans. Carlton is also credited with chairing the first annual Mascot Summit in 2000, which took place at the 50th National Hockey League All-Star Game in Toronto.

Reports of Carlton's retirement were circulated in November 2009, however the Maple Leafs, speaking through their mascot, stated that the report was false. Due to his dedicated service, he is scheduled to pass former Maple Leafs legend George Armstrong for the most Maple Leafs games all-time during the 2023-24 season.

Carlton also appears at games for the Leafs' AHL affiliate, the Toronto Marlies.

Chance the Gila Monster

Chance is an anthropomorphic gila monster and mascot for the Vegas Golden Knights. He was unveiled on October 13, 2017. According to the Golden Knights' website, "Chance emerged from his underground burrow at Red Rock Canyon and made his way to City National Arena in Summerlin to see what all the excitement was about. Once there, he learned how welcoming the hockey community is. Despite being shy and not knowing anyone at the rink, he was invited to come onto the ice and skate. Like many newcomers to the sport, he fell in love with hockey and the Golden Knights." and "Chance represents the inclusive culture of hockey. Everyone is welcome. He demonstrates how important life skills can be developed by playing hockey, such as strong character, dedication, fitness and teamwork. Like the city of Las Vegas, he is strong."

Fin the Whale

Fin the Whale is the mascot of the Vancouver Canucks. He is an anthropomorphic orca that debuted during the 2001-2002 Season.  Fin is usually hanging around the Canucks, proudly beating his drum at every Canucks hockey game. His trademark move consists of steam emitting from his blowhole and his "chomping" of unsuspecting heads at Rogers Arena. Fin is one of the few NHL mascots who plays the position of a goaltender. He is 6'3 and shoots left.

Fin is very affectionate towards children, having been a regular at Canuck Place, a hospice in Vancouver for terminally ill children run by the team.

He is also featured in a series of animated shorts that play during games, produced by Vancouver animation studio Slap Happy Cartoons.  His underwater home is known as Fin's Place in the Georgia Strait.

Gnash
Gnash is the mascot for the Nashville Predators.  The saber-tooth tiger character was selected as the team mascot after archaeological excavations at the First American Cave site in downtown Nashville (in preparation for the construction of what is now known as the UBS Tower) unearthed the partial skeleton of a saber-tooth cat. The name "Gnash" is a pun on the first syllable of the city's name.

The character was introduced in 1998, the same year the team was founded.  His trademark includes stunts: fast rappels from the arena rafters, jumping a 4-wheel/ATV off a ramp onto the ice, and a pendulum swing that takes him under the scoreboard and just inches off the ice.  Gnash also dances during intermissions and pulls pranks on fans of the visiting team, usually ending with a pie in the face.

Gritty

Gritty is the Philadelphia Flyers' first mascot since Slapshot in 1976. He was unveiled to the public on September 24, 2018. He is a 7-foot tall fuzzy orange creature.

Harvey the Hound

Harvey the Hound is the 6-ft, 6-in tall mascot of the Calgary Flames. Created in 1983, Harvey was the NHL's first mascot. He is an anthropomorphic dog, appearing to either be a husky or a malamute.

In 2003, Harvey was involved in an incident with Edmonton Oilers former Coach Craig MacTavish when MacTavish ripped out Harvey's tongue. Harvey the Hound was voted best Mascot in 2004, 3rd in 2005 and 6th in 2006. Harvey also had a long-standing feud with broadcaster Gary Green.

Howler the Coyote
Howler the Coyote is the coyote-suited mascot of the Arizona Coyotes. He was introduced on October 15, 2005. Howler wears number 96 on his jersey, representing the year the Winnipeg Jets moved to Arizona, and wears a "M" Designation for Mascot. He is known to beat on a bucket to encourage the fans to cheer, and has many different outfits in games. Also is an outstanding drummer entertaining Yotes fans around the Phoenix area by joining in with many of the local bands when he appears at the many charity events he and the Coyotes Foundation attends.

Hunter
Hunter is the mascot for the Edmonton Oilers. He is an anthropomorphic Canada lynx and is named after Bill Hunter. He was introduced on September 26, 2016, and wears the number 72, in reference to the team's founding in 1972. He is the team's first official mascot.

Iceburgh

Iceburgh is the official penguin-suited mascot of the Pittsburgh Penguins, resembling a King Penguin. He debuted for the 1992–93 NHL season. Iceburgh was known as "Icey" in the 1995 film Sudden Death starring Jean-Claude Van Damme, filmed at the Pittsburgh Civic Arena. In the movie, the Iceburgh costume was worn by Faith Minton. The name Iceburgh is a play on the words "iceberg" and Pittsburgh. He usually wears a Penguins jersey with the number "00". The costume is almost identical to that of the Wilkes-Barre/Scranton Penguins' team mascot, "Tux." The only difference being that Iceburgh has an orange neck, and Tux's neck is red. Tux also wears red gloves and Iceburgh wears black. Tux wears number "99" on his back with the Wilkes-Barre/Scranton Penguins logo on the front of his jersey.

Louie

Louie is the current mascot of the St. Louis Blues. He was introduced on October 10, 2007, and on November 3, 2007, when the fans voted on the name on the Blues website. Louie is a blue-furred polar bear and wears a Blues jersey with his name on the back. Louie has earned the unofficial nickname "Victory Dog", because of his generic mascot animal appearance.

Mick E. Moose
Mick E. Moose is the mascot of the Winnipeg Jets, as well as their AHL affiliate, the Manitoba Moose. Mick debuted in 1994 for the International Hockey League's Minnesota Moose. Since 1996, he has been the mascot for the IHL/AHL Manitoba Moose, except from 2011 to 2015, when the team played in St. John's as the St. John's IceCaps.  The Jets recalled Mick E. Moose from the AHL in 2011 after deciding that "Ultimately, the fact that Mick E. Moose seemed to connect and resonate with so many of our young fans over the past 15 seasons kept bringing us back to our history and the possibility of retaining him as our mascot.". Mick was introduced as the Jets' new mascot on October 7, 2011. Mick is a brown moose, with two large antlers and wears a blue home jersey and a flying helmet.

N.J. Devil
N.J. Devil is the mascot of the New Jersey Devils. He first appeared in 1993 and was spotted in the rafters of the then-Brendan Byrne Arena. The 7' tall mascot plays into the myth of the Jersey Devil. N.J. Devil often keeps the crowd excited, signs autographs, participates in entertainment during the intermissions, skates across the ice, and runs throughout the aisles of the arena to high five fans. N.J. wears a red Devils jersey with his name and number 00 on the back.

Nordy
The Minnesota Wild unveiled their mascot, named Nordy, on October 5, 2008. Not much is known about the species that belonged to this mascot; some say he is a puma or bear/fox hybrid wearing hockey hair and a green "M" on his forehead. Nordy is the newest member of The Team of 18,000 (The 18,000 refers to the number fans that are in Wild's arena during a sold out game) and wears the jersey number 18,001.

Nyisles
Nyisles was a "seafaring Islander" that the New York Islanders used as a mascot in the mid-90s
prior to Charles Wang obtaining the team and soon replacing him with Sparky the Dragon in 2001. Nyisles was brought out of retirement and given a makeover on December 10, 2022 to coincide with the return of the Fisherman logo on the team's reverse retro uniforms.

Sabretooth

Sabretooth is the mascot of the Buffalo Sabres. He is ostensibly a sabre-toothed tiger. From 1992 to 1998, he was also the mascot of the Buffalo Bandits of the National Lacrosse League. He has a house in KeyBank Center. Before games, he rappels from the ceiling to the ice while rock music plays, and has also been known to ride a four-wheeler on the ice while followed by a spotlight. He has a T-shirt bazooka, which he uses to shoot shirts into the crowd, and plays Sabres chants on a drum. Sabretooth has a gold body with blue stripes, wearing a Sabres jersey; when the Sabres wore the John Rigas-era red and black uniforms, Sabretooth's main color was correspondingly red with black stripes. Sabretooth's autograph can be obtained on the mezzanine level of KeyBank Center within his custom built playhouse. Buffalo Sabres PR Director Paul Wieland and Sabre employee Budd Bailey originally came up with the idea for Sabretooth in the mid-to-late 1980s in an effort to spur fan interest and replicate what the Triple-A Buffalo Bisons baseball team had done with their mascot Buster Bison. Team owners the Knox Family had suggested a mascot of their own and Wieland and Bailey obliged with Sabretooth.

S.J. Sharkie

S.J. Sharkie, an anthropomorphic shark, is the mascot of the San Jose Sharks. He debuted in January 1992.

On March 12, 1999, S.J. Sharkie was involved an incident during the pre-game festivities for that evening's Sharks vs. Red Wings game.  During an attempted rappel from the rafters of SAP Center at San Jose (then known as San Jose Arena), Sharkie's jersey became entangled in the rope and rappel equipment, leaving Sharkie hanging approximately 40 feet above the ice.  Sharkie remained there while the starting lineups were announced and during the singing of the national anthem.  The beginning of the game was delayed 20 minutes while crews worked to rescue him.  He was eventually hoisted upward to a catwalk using a secondary rope.

Slapshot

Slapshot is the official mascot of the Washington Capitals. He is a large bald eagle who wears the jersey number 00. He was officially unveiled on November 17, 1995, and is frequently accompanied at home games by secondary mascots, Air Slapshot and Hat Trick.

Sparky the Dragon
Sparky the Dragon is the dragon-suited mascot for the New York Islanders.  He had served as the mascot for the New York Dragons Arena Football team until the team's 2009 demise. What made him unique was the fact that he wore two sets of colors, depending on the team he rooted for. He wore royal blue and orange. His original navy blue color was changed in summer 2010 to match the Islanders' return to their classic color scheme. His tail resembles a hockey stick. For Dragons contests, he had worn pink, red, and black.  The fact that both teams were owned by computer magnate Charles Wang and both teams played at Nassau Veterans Memorial Coliseum factored into this. On September 22, 2015, it was announced that Sparky would not return as the Islanders mascot at Barclays Center. However, he still made other appearances in Long Island and was shown in NHL ’16. As the 2015–2016 season progressed, unsatisfactory ticket sales prompted Barclays Center CEO Brett Yormark to try and further appeal to the Long Island-centered fan base. On December 27, 2015, during the first intermission of an Islanders vs. Maple Leafs matchup, Sparky was officially reintroduced as the Islanders mascot.

Spartacat
Spartacat is an anthropomorphic lion and the official mascot of the Ottawa Senators since 1992. He is also known to be quite an acrobat as he has been seen swinging through the Canadian Tire Centre arena to get the crowd pumped up before games.  An immediately recognizable part of Ottawan society, Spartacat does his part as an active member of the community by visiting hospitals, schools, and children's hockey games. He has been involved in the "Read to Succeed" literacy drive that has been initiated by the Ottawa Senators to educate children on the importance of reading and participates by visiting schools in the Ottawa area to draw the attention of children to the literacy message.
Spartacat has a fierce rivalry with Carlton the Bear, the official mascot of the NHL ice-hockey team, the Toronto Maple Leafs.

Stanley C. Panther, Mini Stanley and Viktor E. Rat
Stanley C. Panther, Mini Stanley and Viktor E Rat are the three mascots of the Florida Panthers. Stanley C. Panther was named in 1995 by Darrel Ambrosini and is an anthropomorphic Florida panther, hence the name of the team. He is named for the Stanley Cup. At the beginning of the 2007–08 season, the Panthers added a mascot that is half the size of Stanley. Viktor E. Rat was named in October 2014 in honor of the club's 1996 Stanley Cup Final run where rats were tossed on ice and is an anthropomorphic rat.  At the beginning of the 2007–08 season, the Panthers added another mascot that is half the size of Stanley, hence the name "Mini Stanley". Due to Mini Stanley's smaller size, he is a mascot that caters more to children.

Stinger
Stinger is the 6 foot 9 inch bright green mascot of the Columbus Blue Jackets. He is a yellowjacket, who was originally yellow and has been mixed with team's blue to make green, with red eyes. Stinger wears the number 00, shortened from 2000, for the year the Blue Jackets were founded.

A prominent figure at every home game, Stinger is often seen and heard banging his snare drum and giving high-fives to children. After the 2002–03 NHL season, the Blue Jackets adopted a new logo for their jerseys which removed Stinger from their uniforms.

Stormy and Caroline
Stormy is the mascot of the Carolina Hurricanes. He is an anthropomorphic pig, who wears the number 97 (shortened for 1997- the year when the Hartford Whalers moved to North Carolina to play their first game). The reason for a hog mascot is because of the abundance of hog farms in eastern North Carolina and the state's affinity for a vinegar-based pork barbeque. One of the primary figures in bringing the Hurricanes to North Carolina originally wanted to name the team the "Ice Hogs", a team name first used for a UHL team in Rockford, Illinois, in 1999.  While that idea was scratched, the ice hog was worked into the team through Stormy.

In the 2017-18 season, the Hurricanes introduced a secondary mascot, a female counterpart to Stormy named Caroline, a reference to the name of the state and its namesake, mistakenly identified as Queen Caroline; The Carolinas were actually named after King Charles I of England. She appeared in two late season games as Stormy's "old friend from home" in 2017-18, and has been appearing at most games through the 2018-19 season and all games in the 2019 NHL Playoffs.

Thunderbug
Thunderbug is the mascot of the Tampa Bay Lightning.  He is a black and yellow Lightning Bug and wears a jersey with the number 00. He plays a bass drum to simulate a thunderclap. Thunderbug leads the pre-game ritual by accompanying Thunderstruck by AC/DC with his drum. During the game he usually walks around the stands launching T-shirts to fans and providing a bass rhythm during organized cheers and chants.

A video of the Thunderbug spraying a fan of the Boston Bruins with silly string went viral in 2012; less than a week later, a local television station confirmed the female performer was let go, but not exclusively for this incident.

Tommy Hawk
Tommy Hawk is the mascot for the Chicago Blackhawks introduced during the 2001-02 season.  He is a hawk who wears the Blackhawks' famed 4 feathers on his head, along with a Blackhawks jersey and hockey pants.  In December 2018, Tommy Hawk was involved in an altercation with an unidentified fan which was caught on video that went viral.

Victor E. Green

Victor E. Green is the mascot for the Dallas Stars. He is a furry green alien with hockey sticks for antennas who comes from a galaxy far, far away.  His name is a play on the Dallas Stars' team color Victory Green or a reference to former owner Norman Green.  He was introduced on September 13, 2014, and is the first mascot of the Stars' franchise.

Wild Wing
Wild Wing is the mascot for the Anaheim Ducks. It was chosen following a fan "Name the Mascot" write-in contest, where a fan suggested the name. Wild Wing is the first mascot in the history of National Hockey League to descend onto the ice from the rafters of the arena. He is an anthropomorphic duck. He was also featured in the animated series Mighty Ducks, wherein he received the last name of Flashblade, and a younger brother, Nosedive. Wild Wing was the leader of the titular hockey team that also functioned as superheroes, after their previous leader, Canard, was lost in Dimensional Limbo on their way from their home planet of Puckworld chasing after the Saurians, a group of draconic beings who had devastated Puckworld; he inherited the legendary "Mask of DuCaine" from him. During the team's home opener on October 18, 1995, he nearly caught fire attempting to jump through a ring of fire, after his skates caught on a trampoline. He wears the jersey number #93 (referencing the Ducks' founding year, 1993). In Mighty Ducks, Wildwing wears the number #00.

Youppi! and Metal!

Youppi! (Yippee! or Hooray! in French) is the official mascot for the Montreal Canadiens. The exclamation mark is part of the trademarked name. From 1979 to 2004, Youppi! was the mascot of the Montreal Expos baseball team. When the Expos left Montreal, Youppi! was adopted by the hockey franchise, becoming the first league-switching mascot in major league sports history.  Instead of endorsing a number in the back of his jersey, he wears an exclamation mark. Prior to Youppi!, the Canadiens had no official mascot. In 2022, to promote the team's reverse retro jerseys, the team created METAL!, a heavy-metal-obsessed blue creature, who claims to have been Youppi!'s twin brother, and have been the Canadiens mascot from 1979 to 1993, even though there is no evidence of the latter statement.

Former mascots

Badaboum
Badaboum was the mascot of the Quebec Nordiques.  Badaboum emerged as the mascot for Rendez-vous '87 when Quebec City was chosen to host
the NHL All stars festivities pitting the NHL All stars against Soviet national ice hockey team.  Badadoum would later be adopted as the permanent mascot of the Nordiques until the teams' relocation to Denver in 1995.  The mascot is a fuzzy blue creature resembling a seal.

Boomer the Cannon
Boomer the Cannon was a secondary mascot for the Columbus Blue Jackets next to Stinger who first appeared in November 2010. An anthropomorphic gray cannon with wheels and a large white mustache, Boomer was not well received due to his phallic appearance. Boomer was inspired by the goal cannon that fires whenever the Blue Jackets score a goal in their arena.

Howler the Yeti
Howler the Yeti was the first official mascot of the Colorado Avalanche.

Kingston
Kingston was the first mascot of the Los Angeles Kings. He is a snow leopard who was team mascot from 1990 to 1996. In 2015, Kingston came out of retirement to be the new mascot for the Kings' AHL affiliate, the Ontario Reign.

Pete the Penguin
Pete the Penguin was the Pittsburgh Penguins' primary mascot. He was an Ecuadorian-born penguin on loan from the Pittsburgh Zoo. Pete made his first appearance during the second intermission of a game against the Boston Bruins on October 19, 1968. He later died of pneumonia one month into the season. It is believed that his death was due to the ice crew at the arena keeping his nesting area too warm.

A second penguin mascot was loaned to the team and made it through the 1971–72 season.

Prankster Bear
Prankster Bear was the former mascot of the Vancouver Canucks, he was a polar bear similar to Carlton the Bear from the Toronto Maple Leafs. He only lasted for the 1990-91 season.

Pucky the Whale
Pucky the Whale was the mascot of the Hartford Whalers. Pucky was never an actual anthropomorphic mascot. He was the highly regarded pictogram of the Whalers name and shoulder patch on the original WHA New England Whalers uniform, and then NHL Hartford. It was also used as a creative and fun entry to the Whalers' Gift Shop.

He was brought to life to be the Connecticut Whale mascot in 2010 and was retired when the team reverted to the Hartford Wolf Pack identity in May 2013. The women's Connecticut Whale also uses a version of the Pucky logo on their jerseys.

He was a green bipedal beluga whale who wore a whalers jersey with a picture of himself on the front.  There was never a mascot costume for Pucky when the Whalers were in town.

Pucky made an appearance in the 2018-19 NHL Season when the Carolina Hurricanes held a "Whalers Night" event in honor to their franchise history originating with the Hartford Whalers.

The Red Winger
The Detroit Red Wings mascot The Red Winger appeared when Mike Ilitch bought the team in 1982 and continued mascoting until the end of the 1987 season.

Slapshot (Philadelphia)
The Philadelphia Flyers debuted a short-lived skating mascot named Slapshot in 1976. It remained the only mascot in Flyers' team history until the unveiling of Gritty for the 2018-19 season.  Today, the Washington Capitals use a mascot by the same name (see above).

Slapshot (New Jersey)
The New Jersey Devils had a mascot also named Slapshot that was a giant anthropomorphic puck with devil horns. He was replaced with N.J. Devil in 1993.

Thrash
Thrash was the mascot of the Atlanta Thrashers.  He was a 6'3" Georgia brown thrasher who debuted on October 2, 1999. Thrash was retired after the team moved to Winnipeg to become the current Winnipeg Jets in 2011 (the original Jets relocated 15 years previous to become the Arizona Coyotes).

Wally the Whaler
Wally the Whaler was the Hartford Whalers only physical mascot. He appeared starting at the 1991-92 season, but disappeared after that year. Hartford attendance was at its worst at this point after the Ron Francis trade. Wally wore a fishermans rain coat with a sailing shirt and his hat had the Hartford Whalers logo on it. It looked like a cartoon version of the Gorton's Fisherman.

Winger
Winger was the first mascot of the Washington Capitals, was their first before switching to the current mascot Slapshot.  Despite being retired, Winger occasionally appears at Capitals games, usually when there is a mascot event.

References

 
Mascots
National Hockey League